Chrysoritis natalensis, the Natal opal, is a butterfly of the family Lycaenidae. It is found in South Africa, where it is found from the Eastern Cape, along the coast of KwaZulu-Natal and inland to Zululand and the midlands.

The wingspan is 24–30 mm for males and 28–34 mm for females. Adults are on wing year-round with peaks in November and February.

The larvae feed on Chrysanthemoides monilifera and Cotyledon orbiculata. They are associated with ants of the genus Crematogaster.

References

natal
Endemic butterflies of South Africa
Butterflies described in 1966